The following is a timeline of the history of the city of Kampala, Buganda, Uganda.

Prior to 20th century

 1881 - Kasubi Tombs built.
 1885 - Mengo Palace built.
 1894
 Uganda Protectorate established.
 Anglican church built on Namirembe Hill.
 1897 - Mengo Hospital founded.

20th century

 1901 - Kampala Sports Club formed.
 1903 - Nsambya Hospital founded.
 1904 - St. Paul's church built in Mengo.
 1905 - Government station relocated to Nakasero Hill.
 1906
 Kampala designated a township; its area includes Mengo, Nakasero, Namirembe, Nsambya, and Lubaga hills.
 Population: 30,000.
 1908 - Uganda Museum founded.
 1910 - Goan Institute established.
 1911 - Kampala Club founded.
 1913 - Indian Association formed.
 1915 - Port Bell-Kampala railway begins operating.
 1917 - Kampala Public Library established.
 1921 - Central Council of Indian Associations of Uganda headquartered in Kampala.
 1922
 Technical school established.
 Population: 40,000 (approximate).
 1925 - Speke Hotel in business.
 1929 - Entebbe airfield begins operating.
 1931 - Uganda Railway begins operating.
 1948 - Catholic Vicariate of Kampala established.
 1949
 Kampala gains "municipal status".
 Population: 58,000.
 1950 - 28 July: Knifing at hospital.
 1955 - Butabika Hospital opens.
 1957 - Lugogo Cricket Oval in use.
 1958 - Bulange constructed.
 1959
 Serwano Kulubya becomes mayor.
 Population: 46,735 city; 123,332 urban agglomeration.
 1962 - Kampala becomes capital of Uganda.
 1963 - City becomes part of republic of Uganda.
 1964
 Uganda Public Libraries Board headquartered in city.
 Nommo Gallery established.
 1965 - Apollo Hotel in business.
 1966 - Battle of Mengo Hill.
 1967
 East African Development Bank headquartered in Kampala.
 Ugandan National Theatre established.
 1968 - Kawempe, Kyambogo, Luzira, Makindye, Mmengo, Nakawa, Nakulabye, Natete, and Ntinda villages become part of Kampala.
 A. G. Mehta, a Member of Parliament and member of the Uganda People's Congress (UPC), becomes the mayor of Kampala.
 1969
 Catholic pope visits city.
Mayor A.G. Mehta dies in office on March 10. 
 Population: 330,700 urban agglomeration.
 1970 - Crested Towers built.
 1971 - 25 January: Coup.
 1975
 July: Organisation of African Unity summit meeting held.
 Kibuli Hospital founded.
 1978 - October: Uganda–Tanzania War begins.
 1979 - 11 April: Fall of Kampala.
 1980
 Uganda House built.
 Population: 458,503.
 1986
 City taken by National Resistance Army rebels.
 Watoto Church founded.
 1991 - Population: 774,241.
 1994
 Monitor newspaper begins publication.
 26 June: Shooting at wedding.
 Sanyu TV begins broadcasting.
 1996
 Nasser Sebaggala becomes mayor.
 International Hospital Kampala founded.
 1997 - Namboole Stadium opens.
 1998 - Bugala study center established.
 1999
 John Ssebaana Kizito becomes mayor.
 Communications House built.

21st century

 2001
 City limits expanded.
 Red Pepper newspaper begins publication.
 Workers' House and Amamu House built.
 2002
 Baganda political demonstration.
 Population: 1,189,142.
 2004 - The Observer newspaper begins publication.
 2005
 East African Business Week begins publication.
 Uganda Buddhist Centre founded.
 October: Funeral of Milton Obote.
 2006
 Nasser Sebaggala becomes mayor again.
 Kampala Mosque and skateboarding half-pipe built.
 Kampala Serena Hotel in business.
 2007
 April: Racial unrest.
 November: Commonwealth Heads of Government Meeting 2007.
 The Independent news magazine begins publication.
 Uganda Community Libraries Association headquartered in Kampala.
 Imperial Royale Hotel in business.
 Tabu Flo dance troupe formed.
 2008 - Memonet (media network) formed.
 2009 - September: Conflict between Buganda partisans and police.
 2010
 March: Student unrest.
 11 July: Bombings.
 Rolling Stone newspaper begins publication.
 2011
 April: Economic protest.
 Erias Lukwago becomes mayor.
 Population: 1,659,000.
 2012 - Mapeera House (Centenary Bank) built.
 2013
 Google office in business.
 Writivism Literary Festival begins.
 Air pollution in Kampala reaches annual mean of 104 PM2.5 and 170 PM10, much higher than recommended.
2014
 DFCU Group & DFCU Bank move into their new headquarters at DFCU House.
 Population: 1,507,114.
2021 - Attempted assassination of Katumba Wamala

See also
 Kampala Capital City Authority
 List of mayors of Kampala
 History of Uganda

References

Bibliography

  (about Kampala)
 
 
 
 
 
 T. Goodfellow (2010). “’The bastard child of nobody’? Anti-planning and the institutional crisis in Kampala”, Crisis Research Centre.
 S. Lwasa (2010). “Adapting urban areas in Africa to climate change: the case of Kampala”, Current Opinion in Environment and Sustainability, Vol. 2.
 
  (Includes articles about Kampala)
 T. Goodfellow and K. Titeca. (2012). ‘Presidential intervention and the changing ‘politics of survival’ in Kampala’s informal economy’, Cities, Vol. 29 (4).
 
 Tom Goodfellow. ‘Urban planning in Africa and the politics of implementation: contrasting patterns of state intervention in Kampala and Kigali’, in: Arlt, V. and Macamo, E. and Obrist, B., (eds.) Living the City. Zurich: Lit Verlag, 2013.

External links

  (Bibliography of open access  articles)
  (Images, etc.)
  (Images, etc.)
  (Bibliography)
  (Bibliography)
  (Bibliography)
 
 

Timeline
Kampala
kampala
Kampala